"Play, Ruby, Play" is a song written by Tony Brown and Troy Seals. It was originally recorded by Conway Twitty for his 1990 album House on Old Lonesome Road.

It was later recorded by American country music artist Clinton Gregory. It was released in January 1992 as the first single from his album Freeborn Man.  The song peaked at No. 25 on the Billboard Hot Country Singles & Tracks chart and reached number 20 on the RPM Country Tracks chart in Canada.

The song is about an attractive piano player named Ruby, and the narrator's obsession with her. Lisa Smith and Cyndi Hoelzle of Gavin Report wrote that "Gregory demonstrates that he can handle a driving country rock song as well as ballads and honky tonkers".

Chart performance

References

1992 singles
Conway Twitty songs
Clinton Gregory songs
Songs written by Troy Seals
1990 songs
Songs written by Tony Brown (record producer)
Step One Records singles